Koen Barbé (born 20 January 1981) is a Belgian former professional road bicycle racer, who competed as a professional between 2004 and 2013, for the  and  teams.

Barbe retired at the end of the 2013 season, after ten years as a professional.

References

External links

Koen Barbé profile at Landbouwkrediet

Belgian male cyclists
1981 births
Living people
Cyclists from East Flanders
People from Zottegem